Game program may refer to:
Programme (booklet), booklet available at live events, including sporting events
Game programming, software development of video games